Fabrizio Pirovano (1 February 1960 – 12 June 2016) was an Italian professional motorcycle road racer from Biassono.

Motorcycle racing career
He won 10 races and took 37 further podium finishes. He is in the championship's all-time top 10 for starts, points and podiums. Curiously he never took a World Superbike pole position. He won the Italian Superbike title four times.

By the mid-1990s, the World Superbike championship had more international stars (such as Troy Corser and Carl Fogarty) and Pirovano was less competitive. In , a second-place finish at the season-opener at Hockenheim was his only podium, and he left the championship at the end of the year. In  his best results were a pair of 5th places, and this proved to be his last full season. He won a one-off race in the Suzuki GSX-R Cup at the Misano Circuit in June 2006. He died after losing a battle against an incurable tumour on 12 June 2016.

Career statistics

Grand Prix motorcycle racing

Races by year
(key) (Races in bold indicate pole position, races in italics indicate fastest lap)

Superbike World Championship

Races by year
(key) (Races in bold indicate pole position) (Races in italics indicate fastest lap)

Supersport World Championship

Races by year
(key) (Races in bold indicate pole position) (Races in italics indicate fastest lap)

References

1960 births
2016 deaths
Sportspeople from the Province of Monza e Brianza
Italian motorcycle racers
Superbike World Championship riders
Supersport World Championship riders
Deaths from cancer in Lombardy